Villazón is a town in southern Bolivia, on the border with Argentina. It sits directly across La Quiaca River from La Quiaca in Argentina. The town is a busy trading hub, with large quantities of goods flowing north.

It is also a heavily used transit hub for tourists passing into Bolivia. A train line connects Villazón with Tupiza, Uyuni and Oruro. Two train services, the Expreso del Sur and slightly cheaper Wara Wara del Sur, each run twice a week. Buses also connect to many destinations.

Gallery

Populated places in Potosí Department
Argentina–Bolivia border crossings